The native form of this personal name is Kaszás Zoltán.  This article uses Western name order when mentioning individuals.

 Zoltan Kaszas is a Hungarian-American comedian and actor.

Kaszas was born in Budapest, Hungary, and raised by his single mother. He moved to the United States on July 4th 1991 at 4 years old.  He started doing stand-up comedy at the age of nineteen. He has since won the Seattle International Comedy Competition, the San Diego Comedy Festival, San Diego Funniest Person Contest, and the Rockstar Energy Drink Comedy Throwdown.

Kaszas is best known from his Dry Bar Comedy Special “Cat Jokes”, a clip of which has over 60 million views on Facebook. His follow up special “Modern Male” has 2.6 million views on YouTube, and is also heard regularly on SiriusXM. He has won The Seattle Comedy Competition and performed at The Edinburgh Fringe Festival.

References

External links

 

Living people
American stand-up comedians
Year of birth missing (living people)
American people of Hungarian descent